Among the persons beatified   by Pius XII,  a majority are women, with Spanish, Italian and French backgrounds and others.

See also
 List of people beatified by Pope John XXIII
 List of people beatified by Pope Paul VI
 List of people beatified by Pope John Paul II
 List of people beatified by Pope Benedict XVI
 List of people beatified by Pope Francis

References

 
Pius XII